Colonization of Antarctica refers to establishment of civilian settlements in Antarctica having humans, including families, living on the continent of Antarctica. Currently, the continent hosts only two civilian settlements, the Argentinian-administered Esperanza Base and Chilean-administered Villa Las Estrellas, as well as about 70 scientific and military bases with a transient population of scientists and support staff. Antarctica is the only continent on Earth without indigenous human inhabitants, despite its proximity to Argentina and Chile at the Antarctic Peninsula.

At present scientists and staff from 30 countries live on about 70 bases (40 year-round and 30 summer-only), with an approximate population of 4,000 in summer and 1,000 in winter. There have been at least eleven human births in Antarctica, starting with one in 1978 at an Argentine settlement, with seven more at that base and three at a Chilean settlement.

The Antarctic Treaty System, a series of international agreements, presently limit claims and activities on Antarctica. It would need to be modified or abandoned before additional large-scale colonization (coincident with national territorial claims) could legally occur, in particular with respect to the Protocol on Environmental Protection to the Antarctic Treaty.

Past colonization speculation
An idea common in the 1950s was to have Antarctic cities enclosed under glass domes. Power and temperature regulation of the domes would come from atomic driven generators outside of these domes. While the Soviets used radioisotope thermal generators in some of their remote Arctic and Antarctic locations, the Americans experimented with nuclear fission, building on their Army nuclear power plant program. The PM-3A nuclear power reactor at McMurdo Station was plagued with reliability issues (achieving an availability factor of only 74%) and was eventually deemed a pollution hazard and consequently shut down and dismantled.

Buckminster Fuller, the developer of the geodesic dome, had raised the possibility of Antarctic domed cities that would allow a controlled climate and buildings erected under the dome. His first specific published proposal for a domed city in 1965 discussed the Antarctic as a likely first location for such a project. The second base at Amundsen–Scott South Pole Station (operated 1975-2003) resembles a reduced version of this idea; it is large enough to cover only a few scientific buildings.

In 1971, a team led by German architect Frei Otto made a feasibility study for an air-supported city dome two kilometers across that could house 40,000 residents. Some authors have recently tried to update the idea.

Future conditions
Although today Antarctica’s environment is very harsh, conditions may become better in the future. It has been suggested that, as a result of long-term effects of global warming, the beginning of the 22nd century will see parts of West Antarctica experiencing similar climate conditions to those found today in Alaska and Northern Scandinavia. Even farming and crop growing could be possible in some of the most northerly areas of Antarctica.

It is suggested that plants and fungi find a favorable environment around Antarctica's volcanoes to grow, a hint as to where the first agricultural efforts could be led. There are about 110 native species of moss in Antarctica, and two angiosperms (Deschampsia antarctica and Colobanthus quitensis). It is believed those native species will disappear with warmer weather and the arrival of stronger species. Humans are responsible for the introduction of 200 to 300 outside species on the continent.

Recently scientific surveys of an area near the South Pole have revealed high geothermal heat seeping up to the surface from below.

Births in Antarctica
Emilio Marcos Palma (born January 7, 1978) is an Argentine citizen who is the first person known to be born on the continent of Antarctica. He was born in Fortín Sargento Cabral at the Esperanza Base near the tip of the Antarctic Peninsula and weighed 3.4 kg (7 lb 8 oz). Since his birth, about ten others have been born on the continent.

See also
 Antarctic field camps
 Colonialism
 Colonization
 Research stations in Antarctica
 Space colonization
 Territorial claims in Antarctica

References

External links
 Frei Otto's domed city design

Future colonization
History of Antarctica
Territorial claims in Antarctica